The Collins Mansion is a historic home in Great Falls, Montana, United States. The mansion was built in 1891 by Irish born Timothy Edward Collins, a local businessman who initially traveled to Montana during the gold rush. This, his second Great Falls residence was one of the town's first homes built on the west side of the Missouri River.  The brick home, now covered in a stucco facade from the 1960s, is classified as Edwardian and Norman Shaw Queen Anne styles and was Great Falls' first home to be listed on the National Register of Historic Places.  Despite the now hidden brick facade, much of the original, exterior, Victorian details remain today untouched: classical modillions on the third floor dormer, egg-and-dart-crowned porch columns, dentillation beneath the cornice, and fluted pilasters flanking the mullions in the front windows. The mansion's interior contains quarter sawn oak, maple, cherry, birch, and eastern pine woodwork throughout.

References

External links
The Collins Mansion

[

Bed and breakfasts in Montana
Buildings and structures in Great Falls, Montana
Houses completed in 1891
Houses on the National Register of Historic Places in Montana
Queen Anne architecture in Montana
Houses in Cascade County, Montana
National Register of Historic Places in Cascade County, Montana